Menai, an electoral district of the Legislative Assembly in the Australian state of New South Wales was created in 1999 and abolished in 2015.


Election results

Elections in the 2010s

2011

Elections in the 2000s

2007

2003

Elections in the 1990s

1999

References

New South Wales state electoral results by district